The Shepherd's Song is a late 19th-century painting by French artist Pierre Puvis de Chavannes. Done in oil on canvas, the painting depicts shepherds lounging and foraging in an arid landscape. The painting - which was inspired by one of de Chavannes' earlier works - is now in the collection of the Metropolitan Museum of Art.

Description 
De Chavannes painted Sheperd's Song in 1891, drawing inspiration from an earlier mural he had painted. Like his earlier work, the new painting possesses what has been described as a dreamlike feel. The titular shepherds were likely inspired by classical sculpture, while the muted colors of the painting were likely inspired by 15th and 16th century Italian fresco.

References 

1891 paintings
Paintings in the collection of the Metropolitan Museum of Art
Paintings by Pierre Puvis de Chavannes